The Basel tramway network is a network of tramways forming part of the public transport system in Basel, Switzerland, and  its agglomeration - it also reaches into adjacent suburbs in Germany and France. The only two other tramway networks to cross an international border are Geneva's and Strasbourg's tramways. The Basel tram system consists of 12 lines. Due to its longevity (the network is now more than a century old), it is part of Basel's heritage and, alongside the Basel Minster, is one of the symbols of the city.

The trams on the network are operated by two transport providers: Basler Verkehrs-Betriebe (Basel Transport Service) (BVB) and Baselland Transport (BLT). Both operators are part of the integrated fare network Tarifverbund Nordwestschweiz (TNW), which in itself is part of the three countries-integrated fare network triregio.

BVB is owned by, and operates in, Basel-Stadt, the small canton comprising the city of Basel and two smaller municipalities, both situated right of the Rhine.  Its green trams operate mostly in the city, although the termini of its lines 3, 6, and 14 are in the more rural canton of Basel-Land, line 8 terminates across the frontier in Germany, and line 3 in France.

BLT is owned by Basel-Land, and its yellow and red trams operate in the outer suburbs to the south of Basel, and at one point pass through the territory of France. However, the three lines it operates, lines 10, 11 and 17, all also run over BVB track in central Basel. In addition line 14, while owned by BLT, is operated by BVB well into Basel-Land.

History

The first line of the Basel tramway network was opened on 6 May 1895.  It followed the route Centralbahnhof–Marktplatz–Mittlere Brücke–Aeschenplatz–Badischer Bahnhof.

The network grew quickly. In 1897, six new sections were put in service, with one linking Basel and Birsfelden.
 
In 1900, the Basel tramway network acquired an international dimension, when a new cross-border line was opened to Sankt-Ludwig (now Saint-Louis, Haut-Rhin), in the then German Empire. The line operated till 1950. In 1910, a second international line was opened to Hüningen (now Huningue also Haut Rhin), which was used until 1961. The line to Lörrach in Baden, Germany, was opened in 1919 and worked till 1967.

Since 1887, the tram from Basel to Rodersdorf, now part of Baselland Transport line n° 10, passed (and passes) through the village of Leymen in Alsace. But that Birsigthalbahn (Birsig Valley Railway) would be joined to the general tram network of Basel as late as in 1984.

From 1900 until 1936, at least one section of the network was modified each year.
 
During the two World Wars, services were suspended on the parts of the line extending beyond Switzerland's borders. After World War II, several lines were closed.

In 1974, the several companies that had been operating the suburban lines were merged to form the new company bearing the name Baselland Transport AG (BLT).

Lines 
 the Basel tram network comprises 12 lines. Nine are operated by BVB and three by BLT.

Cross-border routes 
The Basel tram network is unusual in crossing international borders.

Line 10 to Rodersdorf runs via Leymen in France. For customs purposes the trams operate through France as privileged transit traffic. Passengers remaining on the tram are not subject to customs rules. Passengers may get on or off the tram in Leymen only if they are carrying goods within the customs limits.

In 2014, line 8 was extended across the border to Weil am Rhein station, in Germany.

Construction started in 2015 to extend Line 3 from its then-terminus at Bourgfelden Grenze to Saint-Louis station in France. The extension opened in 2017. Late-night services on the cross-border line were suspended in 2019 due to a series of attacks in which laser pointers were used to obstruct the vision of tram operators.

Network Map

See also

List of town tramway systems in Switzerland
Trolleybuses in Basel

Notes

Footnotes

References

External links

 Basler Verkehrs-Betriebe (BVB) – official site 
 Baselland Transport (BLT) – official site 
 Tramclub Basel – official site 
 Tram-Museum Basel – official site 
 
 
 Gleisplanweb track map

Transport in Basel
Basel
600 V DC railway electrification
Basel
Cross-border rapid transit